Tower Hill is a London Underground station in Tower Hill in the East End of London. It is on the Circle line between Monument and Aldgate stations, and the District line between Monument and Aldgate East. Tower Hill is within Travelcard zone 1 and is a short distance from Tower Gateway station for the Docklands Light Railway, Fenchurch Street station for National Rail mainline services, and Tower Millennium Pier for River Services.

The entrance to Tower Hill station is a few metres from one of the largest remaining segments of the Roman London Wall which once surrounded the historic City of London. A small section of this wall is visible above the track at the far Eastern end of the Westbound platform, near the ceiling. The station was built on the site of the former Tower of London station that closed in 1884. The present Tower Hill station opened in 1967 and replaced a nearby station with the same name but which was originally called Mark Lane, that was slightly farther west.

In 2021, Transport for London made Tower Hill the tenth Underground station to replace some standard platform logos with 'poppy roundels' for the period leading up to Remembrance Day each year. Opposite the station in Trinity Square Gardens is The Merchant Navy Memorial commemorating merchant seafarers lost in the two World Wars and Falklands Campaign who have no grave but the sea. Its total of some 36,000 names is greater than that of any other Commonwealth War Graves Commission memorial in the UK.

Services
Train frequencies vary throughout the day, but the typical off-peak service pattern is:

District line:
Eastbound:
12 tph (trains per hour) to Upminster.
3 tph to Barking
3 tph terminate here 
Westbound:
6 tph to Ealing Broadway;
6 tph to Richmond;
6 tph to Wimbledon.
Circle line:
Anti-clockwise:
6 tph to Hammersmith via Aldgate.
Clockwise:
6 tph to Edgware Road via Embankment.

Future
A Transport Supporting Paper released by the office of the Mayor of London envisages the closure of Tower Gateway DLR station and the branch serving it, with a replacement interchange being provided via new platforms at Tower Hill tube station. The reasoning is given that currently, 90 per cent of DLR City passengers use Bank station, but only 75 per cent of services go there; this would increase service to Bank from 23tph to 30tph, thereby unlocking more capacity on the Bank branch.

Connections
London Buses routes 15, 42, 78, 100, 343, night routes N15, N551 and long-distance coach routes 734, 735, 736, 761, 762, 763, 764, 765, 769, 770 and 780 serve the station.

References

Circle line (London Underground) stations
District line stations
Tube stations in the London Borough of Tower Hamlets
Tower of London
Railway stations in Great Britain opened in 1967